Colonel Miles Quaritch, is a fictional character and the main antagonist in the American epic science fiction film series Avatar, created by James Cameron. Quaritch served as the chief of security for the human company called Resources Development Administration (RDA) during their war with the Na'vi on Pandora. After former Marine Jake Sully is brought to Pandora, he promises to pay for an operation that would fix Jake's paralysis in exchange for giving information about the Na'vi, but Jake instead falls in love with a Na'vi named Neytiri and begins sympathizing with them. He directed the destruction of the Omaticaya Clan's Hometree and led his forces into an assault on the Tree of Souls, where his human body was killed. The RDA later transferred a copy of the original Quaritch's consciousness into a Na'vi Avatar (dubbed Recombinants), who returns to Pandora both to avenge his previous death, and retrieve his son, Miles "Spider" Socorro, who was left on the moon after his death, and adopted by Jake and Neytiri.

The character is portrayed by Stephen Lang in his human form Avatar (2009), and his Recombinant form in Avatar: The Way of Water (2022) and its upcoming sequels, including the currently untitled third and fourth films. Lang also reprised his role for the film's tie-in video game, James Cameron's Avatar: The Game (2009), and won Best Supporting Actor for his performance as Quaritch in the first film at the 36th Saturn Awards.

Production history

Casting
James Cameron was initially reported to have met with Michael Biehn for the role of Quaritch in Avatar, having previously collaborated on The Terminator, Aliens, The Abyss, and Terminator 2: Judgment Day, and apparently even showed him multiple drafts of the script and some of the 3D test footage. 
Ultimately, Biehn was not cast in any role, as Sigourney Weaver had been cast to play Dr. Grace Augustine in the film and Cameron seemingly did not want audiences to draw comparisons to Aliens. 
Although Cameron confirms he met with Biehn for a part in the film, he disputed the claim that it was for Quaritch.
 
Having remembered Stephen Lang from auditioning for the roles of Dwayne Hicks and Carter Burke in Aliens, Cameron decided to cast Lang as Quaritch. Lang said of his casting:

Characterisation
Despite the character's death at the end of Avatar, Cameron confirmed in 2010 that Lang would return in the film's sequels, stating, "I'm not going to say exactly how we're bringing him back, but it's a science fiction story, after all. His character will evolve into really unexpected places across the arc of our new three-film saga". In October 2019, Lang revealed that his character was always meant to return in the sequels, stating:

Cameron later confirmed that Quaritch would act as the main antagonist across all four sequels. Lang later confirmed that Quaritch would return as a Recombinant, a Na'vi Avatar embedded with the memories of a soldier, which meant that, like the other actors portraying Na'vi characters, Lang's performance in the sequels involved motion capture, which included the new underwater performance capture Cameron developed for the films, which Lang initially found "challenging". Described as "avatars embedded with the memories of human[s]", Quaritch's Recombinant would seek revenge for his human self's death, while seeking to retrieve his son, Miles Quaritch "Spider" Socorro, who was rescued and adopted by Jake and Neytiri after being abandoned on Pandora after his father's initial death.

Appearances

Films

Avatar (2009)

On the moon Pandora, tensions between humans and its indigenous Na'vi had been rising, making it harder for the RDA to mine for unobtanium, a highly valuable mineral used for energy generation which sits under the Omaticaya Clan's Hometree. When paraplegic ex-Marine Jake Sully arrives on Pandora to replace his brother Tom in the Avatar Program, Quaritch offers to pay for his reconstructive leg surgery in exchange for information about the Na'vi, the Omaticaya Clan, their Hometree, and the Tree of Souls. But Jake falls in love with a Na'vi named Neytiri, and begins to sympathize with them and their culture. After Quaritch shows him video logs of Jake lamenting the hopelessness of convincing the Na'vi to leave Hometree, along with reports that the Na'vi had begun burning bulldozers and killing RDA troopers, the RDA's Administrator Parker Selfridge comes to the conclusion that the Omaticaya Clan are a threat to their operation and could not be convinced to leave their Hometree, orders the destruction of the Omaticaya's Hometree, but gives Jake and Dr. Grace Augustine one hour to convince the Na'vi to evacuate Hometree before commencing the attack.

The Na'vi refuse to listen, and after the hour is up, Quaritch and his men destroy Hometree, killing multiple Na'vi. He also separates Jake and Grace from their avatars and imprisons them. Disgusted by Quaritch's brutality, pilot Trudy Chacon returns to base and frees Jake and Grace, airlifting them out of the base. Quaritch shoots Grace during the escape, but fails to stop them from escaping Hell's Gate. Quaritch then begins an assault on the Tree of Souls, quickly dispatching the bewildered Na'vi until Pandora's wildlife, seemingly at the direction of Eywa herself, attacks RDA's forces in mass. With all escorts either distracted or destroyed, Quaritch pursues Jake in his gunship, but he attacks it, causing it to crash. Quaritch escapes from his gunship in an AMP suit and advances to the Tree of Souls. Neytiri arrives on a Thanator to protect the Tree, but Quaritch stabs the thanator with his AMP suit's knife, trapping Neytiri beneath it. Jake arrives and fights Quaritch, but he finds and breaks open the module containing Jake's human body, exposing it to Pandora's poisonous atmosphere, interrupting Jake's link with his Avatar. Quaritch then attempts to slit Jake's throat, but Neytiri fires two arrows into his body, killing him.

Avatar: The Way of Water (2022)

More than a decade later, the RDA return to Pandora, erecting a new main operating base named Bridgehead City to prepare Pandora for colonization. The RDA transfers the consciousness of Quaritch and other deceased RDA soldiers into Na'vi Avatars called Recombinants. After Jake initiates a guerilla campaign against the RDA supply lines, Quaritch and his recombinants capture his children. Jake and Neytiri arrive and free most of them, but Spider is taken by Quaritch, who recognizes him as his son, Miles Quaritch Socorro, who was born on Pandora and was unable to be transported to Earth due to his young age. Quaritch spends time with Spider in order to draw him to the RDA's side, and Spider teaches him more about the Na'vi. Aware of the danger Spider's knowledge of his whereabouts poses to their safety, Jake and his family exile themselves from the Omaticaya and join the Metkayina reef people clan at Pandora's oceans to hide from the RDA. Later, Jake's adoptive daughter Kiri suffers a violent seizure after trying to link with the Metkayina's Spirit Tree, Jake calls Norm Spellman and Max Patel for help, which allows the RDA to track them down. Quaritch brings Spider with him and commandeers a whaling vessel and orders them to kill tulkuns to draw Jake and the Metkayina out. 

Learning of the tulkun killings, Jake's youngest son Lo'ak takes off with his siblings to warn Payakan, a tulkun being chased by the whalers. Quaritch captures Lo'ak, along with Jake's youngest daughter Tuk, and Tsireya, the daughter of the Metkayina's chief, Tonowari, and asks Jake to surrender in exchange for their safe return, but Payakan attacks the whalers, triggering a fight that kills most of the crew and damages the vessel, causing it to sink. Jake's oldest son Neteyam rescues Lo'ak, Tsireya and Spider, but is fatally shot. Jake faces Quaritch, who uses Kiri as a hostage, but desists when Neytiri does the same with Spider. Jake strangles Quaritch into unconsciousness, and escapes the sinking vessel with his family. Spider rescues Quaritch, but renounces him for his cruelty and rejoins Jake's family as Quaritch leaves on his banshee.

Video games

James Cameron's Avatar: The Game (2009)

Lang reprises his role as Quaritch in the game, which is set two years before the events of Avatar. If the player chooses to side with the RDA, Quaritch will appear at the end, taking over the operation from the Central Command in Plains of Goliath from Commander Karl Falco. He will then give Able Ryder a Dragon Ship to go to Tantalus for some charges to blow up a stone wall to access  the Well of Souls, where Ryder will find Falco. After killing Falco and activating the Emulator which cuts off the Na'vi's connection with Eywa, Quaritch congratulates Ryder and orders them to return to base.

Comics

Avatar: The Next Shadow (2021)
An illusionary Quaritch briefly appears in a nightmare Jake has while in a coma, tormenting him alongside the deceased Tsu'tey.

Merchandise
Mattel made an action figure of Quaritch as part of their range of Avatar action figures. Lego has produced Minifigures of Quaritch for its Lego Avatar theme based on the first two films, his human form comes in set 75571 Neytiri & Thanator vs. AMP Suit Quaritch, and  his Recombinant form comes in set 75577 Mako Submarine.

In other media
 Quaritch appears in the 2010 porn parody/spiritual sequel film This Ain't Avatar, portrayed by Evan Stone. He is depicted as having survived his injuries in Avatar (2009).
 In the 2011 The Simpsons "Treehouse of Horror XXII" segment "In the Na'vi", a parody of Avatar, Quaritch's role is filled by Colonel Gary Chalmers, voiced by Hank Azaria, in command of military commando forces sent to Rigel 7 by Krusty the Clown to find and steal the sacred extract Hilarrium from the native people. After Bart Simpson (filling the role of Jake Sully) betrays the military, Chalmers prepares to enter into combat with a bulldozer-like animal (operating a larger animal, much like he operates his own armour within armour), only to be tricked into knocking himself off a cliff by Bart, his armour exploding around him as he hits the forest floor.
 In the 2022 The Asylum parody film Battle for Pandora, Quaritch's role is filled by Colonel William Bradly, portrayed by Michael Scovotti.

Reception

Critical response
Writing for Reelviews, James Berardinelli praised Lang's performance in the first film, writing, "Quartich is never CGI animated but he always seems bigger than life. If there's a human star of Avatar, it's Lang.". Similarly, Chris Hewitt, writing for Empire, described Lang's performance as "excellent" and claimed the character was "a scenery-chewing bad guy so badass that he can breathe the Pandoran air without a mask." Elsewhere, A. O. Scott and Manohla Dargis of The New York Times both singled out Lang's performance in the original film as one of the five best male supporting performances of 2009.

Conversely, Kenneth Turan of the Los Angeles Times criticized the "flat dialogue" and "obvious characterization" of Quaritch and the other antagonists in the first film. Russell D. Moore of The Christian Post concluded that "propaganda exists in the film" and stated "If you can get a theater full of people in Kentucky to stand and applaud the defeat of their country [as represented by Quaritch and his men] in war, then you've got some amazing special effects."

Accolades
Lang's performance as Quaritch in the first film received nominations for Best Villain and Best Fight (with Sam Worthington) at the 2010 Teen Choice Awards and the 2010 MTV Movie Awards, he won Best Supporting Actor at the 36th Saturn Awards. For his motion capture performance in Avatar: The Way of Water, Lang was nominated for Best Voice Acting/Animated/Digital Performance at the Austin Film Critics Association Awards 2022.

Family tree

Notes

References
  Text was copied from Miles Quaritch at Avatar Wiki, which is released under a Creative Commons Attribution-Share Alike 3.0 (Unported) (CC-BY-SA 3.0) license.

Action film characters
Adventure film characters
Avatar (franchise)
Characters created by James Cameron
Fictional bodyguards
Fictional characters with disfigurements
Fictional colonels
Fictional cryonically preserved characters
Fictional extraterrestrial–human hybrids
Fictional mercenaries
Fictional military captains
Fictional military personnel in films
Fictional people from the 22nd-century
Fictional soldiers
Fictional United States Marine Corps personnel
Fictional war criminals
Film characters introduced in 2009
Film supervillains
Male characters in film
Male film villains
Science fiction film characters
Space marines